Väike-Palkna Landscape Conservation Area is a nature reserve situated in Võru County, Estonia.

Its area is 24.7 ha.

The protected area was formed in 1979 as a separate part of Paganamaa Landscape Conservation Area. The goal is to protect Väike-Palkna Lake and its surrounding areas. In 2006, the protected area was redesigned to the landscape conservation area.

References

Nature reserves in Estonia
Geography of Võru County